Chal Mera Putt is a 2019 Indian Punjabi-language comedy-drama Film directed by Janjot Singh and co-produced by Rhythm Boyz Entertainment, Gillz Network and Omjee Star Studios. It stars Amrinder Gill, Simi Chahal, Iftikhar Thakur, Nasir Chinyoti, Akram Udas, Rup Khatkar, Hardeep Gill and Gurshabad. The film revolves around Punjabis trying hard to make a living in a foreign land. The film will followed by a direct sequel Chal Mera Putt 2 (2020). It marked the feature film directorial debut for Janjot Singh.

The film written by Rakesh Dhawan, started its principal photography in May 2019 at Birmingham, and ended in June 2019. Additional filming took place in parts of Punjab, India. Soundtrack of the film is composed by Dr Zeus and Gurcharan Singh, which features vocals from Gill, Gurshabad, Nimrat Khaira, and Bir Singh. It was released in India on 26 July 2019.

Chal Mera Putt grossed over  globally in its theatrical run, making it one of highest-grossing Punjabi films and highest-grossing Punjabi film at overseas with an overseas gross over 3.6 million. At PTC Punjabi Film Awards, the film received six nominations including Best Comedy Film.

Plot 
Jinder, Bikkar and Billa are illegally working in Birmingham, United Kingdom to earn money for family back in India. They are constantly in danger of Immigration Agents raid while working multiple jobs.
Savy and Bal move in next door and they become friends with Jinder. Tavrej and Butta come from Pakistan with the aim of making money. They stay with Chaudhary Shamsher.

One day Jinder, Bikkar and Billa vacate the apartment in hurry thinking police is there to pick them up. While looking for place to stay, they meet Shamsher. Shamsher is also in need for more roommates so they all move in together. Misunderstandings ensue resulting in lock up of Jinder and Billa. In the end, friends all help each other out and solve their problems.

Cast 
 Amrinder Gill as Jaswinder Singh 'Jinder'
 Simi Chahal as Swaran Kaur 'Savy'
 Iftikhar Thakur as Chaudhary Shamsher
 Nasir Chinyoti as Tabrez Waseem
 Rup Khatkar as Bal
 Hardeep Gill as Bikkar Chacha
 Akram Udas as Butta Khan
 Gurshabad as Balwinder Singh 'Billa'
 Seema Kaushal as Chachi
 Raj Dhaliwal as Butta’s wife
 Sanju Solanki as Billa’s father
 Prabhjot Kaur as Chacha’s daughter
 Nimrat Khaira as special appearance in song "Baddlan De Kaalje"
 Agha Majid as Tavrej's Father

Soundtrack 

Soundtrack of the film is composed by Dr Zeus and Gurcharan Singh. Background score is also composed by Gurcharan Singh. Lyrics are written by Harmanjeet, Bir Singh, Satta Vairowalia, and Bunty Bains.

Track List

Production 
Janjot Singh, Virasat Films, and Tata Benipal started working on Chal Mera Putt, Rakesh Dhawan developed the story and later approached to Rhythm Boyz Entertainment to produce. Amrinder Gill started his filming schedule even before the release of Laiye Je Yaarian.  Also, Gill in an interview disclosed that the film is an Indian-Pakistan collaboration and is starring many actors from Pakistan including Iftikhar Thakur, Nasir Chinyoti and Akram Udas. He said, "Our [Indian] films did well in Pakistan like Angrej and their stage dramas are loved in East Punjab. So we went for collaboration." On 2 June 2019, Gill and Simi Chahal were confirmed as lead actors. Gurshabad and Hardeep Gill also play main roles in the film. It marks the feature film directorial debut for Janjot Singh while his first announced film Aahlna is unreleased.

Auditions for the film were held in February 2019 while principal photography of the film took place in single schedule of one month, it began on 25 May 2019 in Birmingham and completed on 26 June 2019 where Sandeep Patil served as cinematographer. Cast of the film spent more than a month in United Kingdom before filming to prepare for their respective characters. Gill in an interview disclosed that filming was initially scheduled for February 2019 but was delayed due to relations between India and Pakistan at the time. The film was edited by Sadik Ali Shaikh and its final cut ran for a total of 123 minutes and 51 seconds.

Release and marketing 
Chal Mera Putt was announced by Amrinder Gill in an interview with BBC in May 2019 and was released on 26 July 2019. The film was released in UAE on 1 August 2019. The film was supposed to release in Pakistan but was not able to obtain a release certificate. The All Indian Cine Workers Association asked for the ban on the film in India for violating ban on collaboration with Pakistani artists set by association after 2019 Pulwama attack. However, the film was released on its scheduled date. Jarnail Singh, production supervisor of the film disclosed that team of the film has faced several problems and people had put various allegations on them including some web portals asking for boycott while some calling it anti-national. He added, “it is said that artists don't belong to any religion or boundary, it's their artistry that matters.” 
The film was made available for streaming on Amazon Prime Video.

Reception

Box office 

Chal Mera Putt was opened at (#6) with A$313,404 and NZ$87,874 at Australia and New Zealand respectively. Also, at the time of release it had a record opening for Punjabi films in Australia for the year. In North America, the film grossed $464,051 in its opening weekend including $153,103 in United States and $310,945 in Canada. In India, the film opened with 63% occupancy at national multiplexes. In United Kingdom, the film grossed £99,293 in its opening weekend. The film grossed over A$530,672 and NZ$144,493 in Australia and New Zealand in its first week. As of its fifth weekend, the became the highest ever grossing Punjabi film at overseas with gross over US$3.6 million, breaking the previous record of Chaar Sahibzaade (2014) which has grossed US$3.57 million in its run. Also, the film became highest-grossing Punjabi film in Australia, Gulf states, and second-highest in United Kingdom and New Zealand.

Critical reception 
Gurnaaz Kaur of The Tribune gave three stars out of five, praising lead cast, she said, "Amrinder Gill is convincing. He is mostly calm and poised [a requirement of his character]. His innocence and naughtiness is heartening. Simi Chahal, on the other hand, looks her bubbly self and plays her part well; just that she doesn’t have that much presence in the movie." She also praised performances from Gurshabad, Hardeep Gill, Iftikhar Thakur, Nasir Chinyoti, Akram Udas and Rup Khatkar. In last added, "The comic timing, the dialogue delivery, the punches— Chal Mera Putt gains on all points."

Accolades 
At PTC Punjabi Film Awards 2020, the film won three awards for Best Comedy Film, Best Debut Director (for Janjot Singh) and Best Actor critics' (for Gill), from six nominations.

Sequel 
After the success of Chal Mera Putt, the makers decided to do a sequel. Chal Mera Putt 2 went on floors on 13 March 2020.

References

External links 
 

2019 films
Punjabi-language Indian films
2010s Punjabi-language films
2019 romantic comedy-drama films
Indian romantic comedy-drama films
2019 comedy films
2019 drama films
India–Pakistan relations in popular culture
Films directed by Janjot Singh